Dion Lunadon (born 4 March 1976) is a New Zealand born musician. He is known for being the guitarist and singer of The D4 and bass player in A Place To Bury Strangers. He is also known for his high energy and often unpredictable stage presence.

Early life
Lunadon was born Dion Palmer in Auckland, New Zealand.

Career
Lunadon played with a number of New Zealand bands, including The Snitches, Marty Sauce and The Source, Nothing at All! and The Rainy Days. He has also played bass and sang with The Scavengers at various reformation shows 

Lunadon was a member of the New Zealand rock band The D4, who produced 2 albums and several E.P.s and singles.

In 2009, Lunadon formed the band True Lovers.

In 2010, Lunadon joined New York noise rockers A Place To Bury Strangers.  As well as regular stage performances, he played and wrote songs in this group on the albums Worship and Transfixation, the EP Onwards to the Wall and a number of other recordings. 

In 2017 Lunadon released his debut solo album.

In March 2020, Lunadon announced his departure from A Place To Bury Strangers. 

On June 10th 2022, Lunadon released his sophomore solo album Beyond Everything via In The Red Records.

Discography

Studio albums
 1995: Nothing at All!, Nothing at All!
 2001: 6twenty, The D4
 2005: Out of My Head, The D4
 2009: True Lovers, True Lovers
 2012: Worship, A Place To Bury Strangers
 2015: Transfixiation, A Place To Bury Strangers
 2017: Dion Lunadon, Dion Lunadon
 2018: Pinned, A Place To Bury Strangers
 2022: Beyond Everything, Dion Lunadon

EPs
 1993: Loophole, Nothing at All!
 1994: Busted, Nothing at All!
 1999: The D4, The D4
 2012: Onwards to the Wall, A Place To Bury Strangers
 2013: Strange Moon, A Place To Bury Strangers
 2019 ‘’Fuzz Club Sessions’’, A Place To Bury Strangers
2019 ‘’Ice Cream Sucks’’, A Place To Bury Strangers
 2020: ‘’Schreien’’, Dion Lunadon

Singles
 2000: "Ladies Man", The D4
 2002: "Rock'n'Roll Motherfucker", The D4
 2002: "Party", The D4
 2002: "Come On!", The D4
 2002: "Get Loose", The D4
 2003: "Exit to the City", The D4
 2004: "Sake Bomb", The D4
 2005: "What I Want", The D4
 2005: "Feel It Like It", The D4
 2012: "Burning Plastic" / "Send Me Your Dreams", A Place To Bury Strangers
 2012: "You Are The One", A Place To Bury Strangers
 2012: "Leaving Tomorrow", A Place To Bury Strangers
 2012: "And I'm Up", A Place To Bury Strangers
 2012: "Less Artists More Condos Series", #1 split single with Ceremony, A Place To Bury Strangers
 2013: "Raiser" 7", A Place To Bury Strangers
 2015: "We've Come So Far" 7", A Place To Bury Strangers
 2015: "Straight" 7", A Place To Bury Strangers
 2016: "Com/Broke" 7", Dion Lunadon  
 2020: "When Will I Hold You Again", Dion Lunadon

References

1976 births
Living people
New Zealand musicians